In number theory, a natural number is called k-almost prime if it has k prime factors. More formally, a number n is k-almost prime if and only if Ω(n) = k, where Ω(n) is the total number of primes in the prime factorization of n (can be also seen as the sum of all the primes' exponents):

A natural number is thus prime if and only if it is 1-almost prime, and semiprime if and only if it is 2-almost prime. The set of k-almost primes is usually denoted by Pk. The smallest k-almost prime is 2k. The first few k-almost primes are:

The number πk(n) of positive integers less than or equal to n with exactly k prime divisors (not necessarily distinct) is asymptotic to:

 
a result of Landau. See also the Hardy–Ramanujan theorem.

Properties
The multiple of a -almost prime and a -almost prime is a -almost prime.
A -almost prime cannot have a -almost prime as a factor for all .

References

External links 
 

Integer sequences
Prime numbers